Munt Cotschen is a mountain of the Livigno Alps, located on the border between Italy and Switzerland. It lies on the range lying between the Val Chamuera (above Chamues-ch in Graubünden) and the Livigno valley (Lombardy).

References

External links
 Munt Cotschen on Hikr

Mountains of the Alps
Alpine three-thousanders
Mountains of Graubünden
Mountains of Lombardy
Italy–Switzerland border
International mountains of Europe
Mountains of Switzerland
La Punt Chamues-ch